Waitematā is a local government area covering the most central suburbs of Auckland, in New Zealand's Auckland Region. It is governed by the Waitematā Local Board and Auckland Council, and is located within the council's Waitematā and Gulf Ward.

Geography

The western part of the suburb includes the suburbs of Western Springs, Herne Bay, Westmere, Grey Lynn, Arch Hill, St Mary's Bay, Ponsonby and Freemans Bay.

In the north is Wynyard Quarter, Auckland Waterfront and Auckland Central. To the south is the suburbs of Newton, Eden Terrace and Grafton. In the west is the suburbs of Newmarket and Parnell.

The area includes Auckland War Memorial Museum, Auckland Domain Auckland Art Gallery, Western Springs Reserve, Studio One Toi Tū, the Aotea Centre, the Civic Theatre, the University of Auckland and AUT University. The main site of Ports of Auckland is located on the waterfront.

References